Cyclin-dependent kinase 7, or cell division protein kinase 7, is an enzyme that in humans is encoded by the CDK7 gene.

The protein encoded by this gene is a member of the cyclin-dependent protein kinase (CDK) family. CDK family members are highly similar to the gene products of Saccharomyces cerevisiae cdc28, and Schizosaccharomyces pombe cdc2, and are known to be important regulators of cell cycle progression.

This protein forms a trimeric complex with cyclin H and MAT1, which functions as a Cdk-activating kinase (CAK). It is an essential component of the transcription factor TFIIH, that is involved in transcription initiation and DNA repair. This protein is thought to serve as a direct link between the regulation of transcription and the cell cycle.

Clinical significance eg cancer 

Given that CDK7 is involved in two important regulation roles, it's expected that CDK7 regulation may play a role in cancerous cells. Cells from breast cancer tumors were found to have elevated levels of CDK7 and Cyclin H when compared to normal breast cells. It was also found that the higher levels were generally found in ER-positive breast cancer. Together, these findings indicate that CDK7 therapy might make sense for some breast cancer patients. Further confirming these findings, recent research indicates that inhibition of CDK7 may be an effective therapy for HER2-positive breast cancers, even overcoming therapeutic resistance. THZ1 was tested on HER2-positive breast cancer cells and exhibited high potency for the cells regardless of their sensitivity to HER2 inhibitors. This finding was demonstrated in vivo, where inhibition of HER2 and CDK7 resulted in tumor regression in therapeutically resistant HER2+ xenograft models.

Inhibitors 
The growth suppressor p53 has been shown to interact with cyclin H both in vitro and in vivo. Addition of wild type p53 was found to heavily downregulated CAK activity, resulting in decreased phosphorylation of both CDK2 and CTD by CDK7. Mutant p53 was unable to downregulate CDK7 activity and mutant p21 had no effect on downregulation, indicating that p53 is responsible for negative regulation of CDK7.

In 2017 CT7001, an oral CDK7 inhibitor, started a phase 1 clinical trial.

THZ1 is an inhibitor for CDK7 that selectively forms a covalent bond with the CDK7-cycH-MAT1 complex. This selectivity stems from forming a bond at C312, which is unique to CDK7 within the CDK family. CDK12 and CDK13 could also be inhibited using THZ1 (but at higher concentrations) because they have similar structures in the region surrounding C312. It was found that treatment of 250 nM THZ1 was sufficient to inhibit global transcription and that cancer cell lines were sensitive to much lower concentrations, opening up further research into the efficacy of using THZ1 as a component of cancer therapy, as described above.

In renal cell carcinoma (RCC), the expression of CDK7 was significantly higher in the advanced stage tumors. Besides, the overall survival was significantly shorter in patients with higher CDK7 expression in the tumors. These results suggest that CDK7 may be a potential target for overcoming RCC.

Based on molecular docking results, Ligands-3, 5, 14, and 16 were screened among 17 different Pyrrolone-fused benzosuberene compounds as potent and specific inhibitors without any cross-reactivity against different CDK isoforms. Analysis of MD simulations and MM-PBSA studies, revealed the binding energy profiles of all the selected complexes. Selected ligands performed better than the experimental drug candidate (Roscovitine). Ligands-3 and 14 show specificity for CDK7. These ligands are expected to possess lower risk of side effects due to their natural origin.

In urothelial carcinoma (UC), CDK7 expression is increased in bladder cancer tissues, especially in patients with chemoresistance. CDK7 inhibition-related cancer stemness suppression is a potential therapeutic strategy for both chemonaïve and chemoresistant UC.

Interactions 

Cyclin-dependent kinase 7 has been shown to interact with:

 Androgen receptor, 
 Cyclin H, 
 GTF2H1, 
 MNAT1, 
 P53, 
 SUPT5H, and
 XPB.

See also 
 Cyclin-dependent kinase
 CDK7 pathway

References

Further reading

External links 
 
 
 
 

Cell cycle
Proteins
EC 2.7.11